Willie Lee Patterson, Jr. (April 1, 1919 – August 20, 2004) was an American Negro league infielder and catcher in the 1940s and 1950s.

A native of Americus, Georgia, Patterson began his Negro league career in 1946 with the Birmingham Black Barons, and was named to the 1952 and 1953 East–West All-Star Games. After his baseball career, Patterson worked as a longshoreman in Mobile, Alabama until his retirement in 1981. He died in Mobile in 2004 at age 85.

References

External links
 Willie Patterson at Negro Leagues Baseball Museum

1919 births
2004 deaths
Birmingham Black Barons players
Chicago American Giants players
Memphis Red Sox players
New York Cubans players
Philadelphia Stars players
20th-century African-American sportspeople
Baseball infielders
21st-century African-American people